The Secret of Deep Harbor is a 1961 film directed by Edward L. Cahn, and starring Ron Foster and Merry Anders.

It was a remake by producer Edward Small of his earlier I Cover the Waterfront (1932).

Plot
Reporter Skip Hanlon (Ron Foster) is stuck in Deep Harbor, a bit frustrated about nothing happening there and stalled in his "career". He meets Janey Fowler (Merry Anders), whose father Milo (Barry Kelley) is the captain of a charter boat. The "syndicate" pays the captain to transport gangsters out of the U.S.. Then the mobster on Milo´s boat coldbloodedly kills one of his escape-passengers because he tricked the mafia. The body is drowned with an anchor of Milo´s. Hanlon´s best friend Barney (Norman Alden) has a salvage service and finds the anchor tied to the dead. Whereas Skip and Janey develop a relation she identifies the anchor as being Milo´s and thus Skip gets his scoop that brings him national attention and the contempt of Janey who feels betrayed. Milo can escape the arrest by the police and asks Janey to help him to flee to Mexico.  Wounded by a shot he hides in a warehouse when Skip sees him. Milo shoots at him in a father/son-in-law-to-be-encounter but then dies after fainting Skip asked Janey to marry him.

Cast list
Ron Foster as Skip Hanlon
Barry Kelley as Milo Fowler
Merry Anders as Janey Fowler
Norman Alden as Barney Hanes
James Seay as Travis
Grant Richards as Rick Correll
Ralph Manza as Frank Miner
Billie Bird as Mama Miller
Elaine Walker as Rita
Max Mellinger as Doctor

See also
 List of American films of 1961

References

External links

1961 films
1960s English-language films
American black-and-white films
1961 drama films
Films directed by Edward L. Cahn
American drama films
Films produced by Edward Small
Films scored by Richard LaSalle
United Artists films
1960s American films